Joseph Eric Stephenson (17 September 1914 – 8 September 1944) was an English footballer who played as an inside left at both professional and international levels.

Career
Born in Bexleyheath, Stephenson signed for Leeds United in 1933, turned professional in 1934, and made his first-team debut in 1935.

Stephenson also earned two international caps for England in 1938.

War service

After leaving Leeds in 1941 to become a Major in the Gurkha Rifles, Stephenson died in active service in British Burma in September 1944 and is buried at Taukkyan War Cemetery, Myanmar. His younger brother Ernest had died in action August 1943, at the age of 27.

References

1914 births
1944 deaths
English footballers
England international footballers
Leeds United F.C. players
English Football League players
Indian Army personnel killed in World War II
Royal Gurkha Rifles officers
Footballers from Bexleyheath
Association football inside forwards